Magdaleno is a both a surname and a given name of Spanish origin. Notable people with the name include:

Diego Magdaleno (born 1986), American boxer
Enrique Magdaleno (born 1955), Spanish footballer
Jesús Magdaleno (born 1991), American boxer
Magdaleno Cano (1933–2009), Mexican cyclist
Magdaleno Mercado (born 1944), Mexican boxer

Surnames of Spanish origin